July 4 - Eastern Orthodox Church calendar - July 6

All fixed commemorations below are celebrated on July 18 by Old Calendar.

For July 5, Orthodox Churches on the Old Calendar commemorate the Saints listed on June 22.

Saints
 Martyr Anna, at Rome (304)
 Martyr Cyrilla of Cyrene in Libya, a widow (4th century)
 Hieromartyr Athanasius, Deacon, of Jerusalem (451)
 Venerable Lampadus, monk, of Irenopolis (10th century)
 Venerable Athanasius of Mt. Athos and his six disciples (1000)

Pre-Schism Western saints
 Hieromartyr Stephen of Rhegium (Stephen of Nicea), Bishop of Rhegium, disciple of Apostle Paul, and with him Bishop Suerus and the women Agnes, Felicitas, and Perpetua (1st century)
 Saint Zoe of Rome (c. 286)
 Saints Agatho and Triphina, martyrs in Sicily (c. 306)
 Saints Fragan and Gwen Teirbron (Blanche) of Brittany (5th century)
 Saint Philomena, a saint venerated in San Severino near Ancona in Italy (c. 500)
 Saint Edana (Etaoin), patron of parishes in the west of Ireland, a famous holy well bears her name.
 Saint Erfyl (Eurfyl), founder of the church of Llanerfyl in Powys in Wales.
 Saints Probus and Grace, saints of Cornwall, by tradition husband and wife.
 Saint Triphina, the mother of St Tremorus the infant-martyr, she spent the latter years of her life in a convent in Brittany (6th century)
 Saint Numerian (Memorian), Bishop of Trier, Confessor (c. 666)
 Saint Morwenna, patroness of Morwenstow, England (6th century)  (see also July 8 )
 Saint Modwenna, successor of St. Hilda as Abbess of Whitby in England (c. 695)
 Saint Modwenna (Modwena), an anchoress and later Abbess of Polesworth in Warwickshire, England (9th century)

Post-Schism Orthodox saints
 Saints Athanasius and Theodosius of Cherepovets (both c. 1388), disciples of St. Sergius of Radonezh.
 New Martyr Cyprian of Koutloumousiou Monastery, Mount Athos (1679)

New martyrs and confessors
 New Hieromartyr Gennadius Zdorovtsev, Priest, with New Martyrs Abbess Elizabeth (Romanova), Grand Duchess of Russia, Nun Barbara, and those with them, at Alapaevsk (1918): 
 Grand Duke Sergius; the Princes John, Constantine, Igor, and Vladimir; and Martyr Theodore. 
 New Confessor Agapitus (Taube), Monk of Optina Monastery (1936)

Other commemorations
 Icon of the Mother of God "Economissa".
 Uncovering of the relics (1422) of Venerable Sergius of Radonezh, Abbot and Wonderworker (1392)
 Synaxis of 23 Saints of Lesvos.

Icon gallery

Notes

References

Sources
 July 5/July 18. Orthodox Calendar (PRAVOSLAVIE.RU).
 July 18 / July 5. HOLY TRINITY RUSSIAN ORTHODOX CHURCH (A parish of the Patriarchate of Moscow).
 July 5. OCA - The Lives of the Saints.
 July 5. The Year of Our Salvation - Holy Transfiguration Monastery, Brookline, Massachusetts. 
 The Autonomous Orthodox Metropolia of Western Europe and the Americas (ROCOR). St. Hilarion Calendar of Saints for the year of our Lord 2004. St. Hilarion Press (Austin, TX). p. 49.
 The Fifth Day of the Month of July. Orthodoxy in China.
 July 5. Latin Saints of the Orthodox Patriarchate of Rome.
 The Roman Martyrology. Transl. by the Archbishop of Baltimore. Last Edition, According to the Copy Printed at Rome in 1914. Revised Edition, with the Imprimatur of His Eminence Cardinal Gibbons. Baltimore: John Murphy Company, 1916. pp. 195–196.
 Rev. Richard Stanton. A Menology of England and Wales, or, Brief Memorials of the Ancient British and English Saints Arranged According to the Calendar, Together with the Martyrs of the 16th and 17th Centuries. London: Burns & Oates, 1892. pp. 309–312.
Greek Sources
 Great Synaxaristes:  5 ΙΟΥΛΙΟΥ. ΜΕΓΑΣ ΣΥΝΑΞΑΡΙΣΤΗΣ.
  Συναξαριστής. 5 Ιουλίου. ECCLESIA.GR. (H ΕΚΚΛΗΣΙΑ ΤΗΣ ΕΛΛΑΔΟΣ). 
  ΙΟΥΛΙΟΣ. Αποστολική Διακονία της Εκκλησίας της Ελλάδος (Apostoliki Diakonia of the Church of Greece).
  05/07/2018. Ορθόδοξος Συναξαριστής. 
Russian Sources
  18 июля (5 июля). Православная Энциклопедия под редакцией Патриарха Московского и всея Руси Кирилла (электронная версия). (Orthodox Encyclopedia - Pravenc.ru).
  5 июля по старому стилю / 18 июля по новому стилю. Русская Православная Церковь - Православный церковный календарь на 2018 год.
  5 июля (ст.ст.) 18 июля 2014 (нов. ст.). Русская Православная Церковь Отдел внешних церковных связей. (DECR).

July in the Eastern Orthodox calendar